Violet Romer (1886–1970) was an American dancer.

Biography
She was born in 1886 in San Francisco, California, and became notable as an American actress, dancer, and flapper.

In addition to being a performer, Romer founded her own dance school.

Romer died in Port Jefferson, New York in 1970.

References

External links

Broadwayworld.com

1886 births
1970 deaths
American stage actresses
American female dancers
Actresses from San Francisco
20th-century American actresses
20th-century American dancers